Najas flexilis is an aquatic annual plant native to parts of North America and Europe. It is native to northern and central Europe from Norway to Ireland to Switzerland, and from there across Russia (including Siberia). It is also considered native throughout most of Canada, and the northern United States in disjunct populations in southern California, Arizona, Missouri, South Carolina and Utah. Its common names include slender naiad and nodding waternymph.

Najas flexilis inhabits shallow bodies of brackish and fresh water such as lakes and bays.  It is also native to northern Europe, where its range includes Scotland, Poland and Sweden.  It is rare in the European portion of its range and is strictly protected by Appendix I of the Berne Convention. The largest population is in Lake Sīveri in Latvia.

References

External links
Jepson Manual Treatment

flexilis
Aquatic plants
Plants described in 1801
Flora of Europe
Flora of Russia
Flora of Siberia
Flora of North America
Flora without expected TNC conservation status